The 2nd IPC Ice Sledge Hockey World Championships was held between March 20, 2000 and March 25, 2000 at the E Center in West Valley City, Utah, United States.The same place where would host the same sport two years later as the first test event for the Paralympic Winter Games in 2002. Participating countries: Canada, Estonia, Japan, Norway, Sweden and United States.

Final rankings
Canada beat Norway 2-1 to win the gold medal. The game went into overtime and more than 6,000 fans cheered on as Canada’s Shawn Matheson scored the winning goal. The victory gave Canada, the country that created the sport, its first gold medal in sledge hockey, and avenged a gold-medal loss to Norway at the 1998 Paralympics in Nagano. Sweden grabbed the bronze by beating Japan 5-1, while Estonia squared off with the United States to take 5th place.

See also
 Ice sledge hockey
 Ice hockey#Sledge hockey
 1996 IPC Ice Sledge Hockey World Championships
 Ice sledge hockey at the 2002 Winter Paralympics
 2004 IPC Ice Sledge Hockey World Championships
 Ice sledge hockey at the 2006 Winter Paralympics
 2008 IPC Ice Sledge Hockey World Championships

External links
 Winter Sports Celebrate New World Champions

IPC Ice Sledge Hockey World Championships
International ice hockey competitions hosted by the United States
Sports in Salt Lake City
World Para Ice Hockey Championships
U-17
2000 in sports in Utah
Ice hockey in Utah
March 2000 sports events in the United States